The Moeangiangi River is a river of the Hawke's Bay region of New Zealand's North Island.

See also
List of rivers of New Zealand

References

Rivers of the Hawke's Bay Region
Rivers of New Zealand